Bernard Cabanis (born 23 June 1950) is a French ice hockey player. He competed in the men's tournament at the 1968 Winter Olympics.

References

1950 births
Living people
Olympic ice hockey players of France
Ice hockey players at the 1968 Winter Olympics
Sportspeople from Saint-Germain-en-Laye